SM U-107 was one of the 329 submarines serving in the Imperial German Navy in World War I. 
U-107 was engaged in the naval warfare and took part in the First Battle of the Atlantic.

U-107 was surrendered to the Allies at Harwich on 20 November 1918 in accordance with the requirements of the Armistice with Germany. She was sold by the British Admiralty to George Cohen on 3 March 1919 for £2,425 (excluding her engines), and was broken up at Swansea.

Design
German Type U 93 submarines were preceded by the shorter Type U 87 submarines. U-107 had a displacement of  when at the surface and  while submerged. The submarine was powered by two  engines for use while surfaced, and two  engines for use while submerged. She had two propeller shafts and two  propellers.

U-107 was fitted with six  torpedo tubes (four at the bow and two at the stern), twelve to sixteen torpedoes, one  SK L/45, and one  SK L/30 deck gun. She had a complement of thirty-six (thirty-two crew members and four officers).

Summary of raiding history

References

Notes

Citations

Bibliography

World War I submarines of Germany
German Type U 93 submarines
Ships built in Kiel
1917 ships
U-boats commissioned in 1917